Pedini is an Italian surname. People with the surname include:

Carlo Pedini (born 1956), Italian classical composer
Federico Pedini Amati (born 1976), Sammarinese politician  
Maria Lea Pedini-Angelini (born 1954), Sammarinese politician 
Mario Pedini (1918–2003), Italian politician 

Surnames of Italian origin